"Come Home" is the third release taken from the fifth IAMX studio album The Unified Field.

Music video 
The black and white video, shot in Los Angeles, California, shows Chris Corner singing in a house before exiting and walking onto a balcony.  This is interspersed with scenes of live band member Janine Gezang.  It was shot in early 2013 while Chris was staying in the US.

References

2012 songs
Songs written by Chris Corner